Joseph Philip Baker is an English former professional footballer who played as a right winger for Leyton Orient in the Football League in the late 1990s.

Baker was born in Kentish Town, London, on 19 April 1977. He came through the youth ranks at Chelsea and Charlton Athletic before signing for Leyton Orient in May 1995. He started only 23 games in the Football League but made 52 appearances as a substitute, scoring three goals. He was never able to pin down a starting place in the first team and after five seasons, he was released by Orient in October 1999 and dropped into non-league football with Sutton United and Billericay Town for whom he made over 100 appearances.

Career statistics 
Source:

References 

1977 births
Living people
Footballers from Greater London
English footballers
Association football wingers
Leyton Orient F.C. players